Tetraconta is a genus of moths in the family Cosmopterigidae. It contains only one species, Tetraconta clepsimorpha, which is found in Australia (Queensland).

References

External links
Natural History Museum Lepidoptera genus database

Cosmopteriginae